Goodenia byrnesii is a species of flowering plant in the family Goodeniaceae and is endemic to northern Australia. It is prostrate to low-lying herb with short-lived, lance-shaped leaves at the base, egg-shaped to oblong, toothed stem leaves, and leafy racemes of yellow flowers.

Description
Flowering occurs from January to June and the fruit is a more or less spherical capsule  in diameter.

Taxonomy and naming
Goodenia byrnesii was first formally described in 1990 by Roger Charles Carolin in the journal Telopea from specimens collected near Elliott by Norman Byrnes. The specific epithet (byrnesii) honours the collector of the type.

Distribution and habitat
This goodenia grows on black soil plains in the Kimberley region of Western Australia, the northern part of the Northern Territory and the Burke district of north-west Queensland.

References

byrnesii
Flora of Queensland
Eudicots of Western Australia
Flora of the Northern Territory
Plants described in 1992
Taxa named by Roger Charles Carolin